The 1989–90 Yugoslav First League season was the 44th season of the First Federal League, the top level association football competition of SFR Yugoslavia, since its establishment in 1946.

Two points were awarded for a win, none for a loss, while in case of a draw a penalty shootout was taken with the winner of the shootout being awarded one point.

Red Star won the 17th title.

The season began on 29 July 1989 with its fall part completing on 17 December 1988. Following a two-month winter break, the season resumed on 18 February 1990 and ran until 16 May 1990.

League table

Results 
Results in brackets indicate the results from penalty shoot-outs whenever games were drawn.

Winning squad

Top scorers

See also
1989–90 Yugoslav Second League
1989–90 Yugoslav Cup
Dinamo Zagreb-Red Star Belgrade riot

External links
Yugoslavia Domestic Football Full Tables

Yugoslav First League seasons
Yugo
1989–90 in Yugoslav football